Cymatona is a genus of sea snails, marine gastropod molluscs in the family Cymatiidae.

Species
Species within the genus Cymatona include:
 Cymatona kampyla
 Cymatona philomelae

References

 Powell A W B, New Zealand Mollusca, William Collins Publishers Ltd, Auckland, New Zealand 1979 

Cymatiidae